Owen John Dolan (born 30 September 1928) is the Coadjutor Bishop Emeritus of Palmerston North. He was appointed coadjutor bishop by Pope John Paul II on 2 November 1995 and was consecrated on 10 December 1995. He retired on 30 September 2004.

References

External links

 Catholic Hierarchy website, Bishop Owen John Dolan (Retrieved 31 January 2011).

 

People educated at St. Patrick's College, Silverstream
Holy Name Seminary alumni
20th-century Roman Catholic bishops in New Zealand
People from Hāwera
People from Palmerston North
Living people
1928 births
Roman Catholic bishops of Palmerston North